Manuia Porter (born 1948) is a former Samoan international lawn bowler.

Bowls career
Porter has represented Samoa at two Commonwealth Games; at the 2002 Commonwealth Games and the 2006 Commonwealth Games.

She won a bronze medal at the 2007 Asia Pacific Bowls Championships.

References

1948 births
Living people
Bowls players at the 2002 Commonwealth Games
Bowls players at the 2006 Commonwealth Games
Samoan bowls players